Naehyuck Chang is a Professor of electrical engineering at KAIST, Seoul, Korea.

Chang obtained his BS, MS, and PhD degrees from the Department of Control and Instrumentation at Seoul National University, of which he later became faculty member and later served as Vice Dean of its College of Engineering. In 2012, Chang was elected as chair of a Special Interest Group within the Association for Computing Machinery.

Chang was named Fellow of the Institute of Electrical and Electronics Engineers (IEEE) in 2012 for contributions to system-level power characterization, including thermal management and in 2015 he was named an ACM Fellow by the Association for Computing Machinery.

References

External links

20th-century births
Living people
South Korean engineers
Seoul National University alumni
Academic staff of Seoul National University
Academic staff of KAIST
Fellow Members of the IEEE
Fellows of the Association for Computing Machinery
Year of birth missing (living people)
Place of birth missing (living people)